The Brampton Honey Badgers are a Canadian professional basketball team based in Brampton, Ontario, that competes in the Canadian Elite Basketball League. They play their games at the CAA Centre. The team was founded in 2018 as the Hamilton Honey Badgers and played at the FirstOntario Centre in Hamilton, Ontario from their inaugural season in 2019 until 2022.

History
On May 2, 2018, the Canadian Elite Basketball League announced Hamilton, Ontario, as one of the original six teams for its inaugural season beginning May 2019. On June 12, 2018, at a press conference the CEBL announced the logo and name of its Hamilton franchise as the Hamilton Honey Badgers, a nickname inspired by the world's most fearless animal. The team also announced the hiring of former Toronto Raptors' executive John Lashway as team president. On December 19, 2019, the organization appointed Jermaine Anderson as the new general manager of the team.

The Honey Badgers won their first game, at home over Edmonton, 103–86 on May 12, 2019.

The Honey Badgers made the playoffs and defeated the Niagara River Lions but lost in the CEBL Finals to the Saskatchewan Rattlers.

The Honey Badgers won their first title on August 14, 2022, against the Scarborough Shooting Stars, 90–88, clinching a berth, at the 2022–23 BCL Americas.

On November 28, 2022, the league announced due to renovations to the FirstOntario Centre, the Honey Badgers had relocated to Brampton permanently.

Players

Current roster

Notable players

 Brianté Weber

Honours
CEBL
Champions (1):  2022

Season-by-season record

References

External links 
 Official website

Sports teams in Hamilton, Ontario
2018 establishments in Ontario
Basketball teams established in 2018
Basketball teams in Ontario
Canadian Elite Basketball League teams
Sport in Brampton